All About Me is a song by American singer and songwriter Syd. It was released on January 11, 2017, as the lead single from her debut album Fin.

Composition and lyrics
Production of the song was handled by Steve Lacy, a fellow member of The Internet. The beat features hazy synth tones, with "heavy-kicking 808 bass and skittering hi-hats". Lyrically, the song mixes braggadocio with lines about keeping a close support circle, such as, "Take care of the family that you came with". Throughout, Syd uses a half-sung, half-rapped delivery.

Music video
The music video, released on January 12, 2017, consists of Syd performing the lyrics in a warehouse. It features cameos from Odd Future members Tyler, The Creator, Hodgy Beats, and Mike G.

References

External links
Lyrics of this song at Genius

2017 singles
2017 songs
Columbia Records singles